The Little Cloquet River is a  river located in southern Saint Louis County, Minnesota, United States.  
It is a tributary of the Cloquet River.

The Little Cloquet River flows through North Star Township and Marion Lake Unorganized Territory, located north of Duluth.

See also
List of rivers of Minnesota

References

Minnesota Watersheds
USGS Hydrologic Unit Map - State of Minnesota (1974)

Rivers of Minnesota
Rivers of St. Louis County, Minnesota